The 25th New York Infantry Regiment, the "Union Rangers", was an infantry 
regiment that served in the Union Army during the American Civil War.

Service
The regiment was organized in New York City, New York, on May 10, 1861, and was mustered in for a two-year enlistment on June 28, 1861.

The regiment was mustered out of service on June 26, 1863, and those men who had signed three year enlistments were transferred to the 44th New York.

Total strength and casualties
The regiment suffered 7 officers and 54 enlisted men who were killed in action or mortally wounded and 4 officers and 25 enlisted men who died of disease, for a total of 90 fatalities.

Commanders
 Colonel James E. Kerrigan
 Colonel Charles Adams Johnson

See also
List of New York Civil War regiments

Notes

References
The Civil War Archive

External links
New York State Military Museum and Veterans Research Center - Civil War - 25th Infantry Regiment History, photographs, table of battles and casualties, and historical sketch for the 25th New York Infantry Regiment.

Infantry 025
1861 establishments in New York (state)
Military units and formations established in 1861
Military units and formations disestablished in 1863
1863 disestablishments in New York (state)